Fly2K is Playa Fly's first album released on Minnie Mae Muzik. Fly2K was to be released in 2000, but due to his incarceration, the release date was pushed back 2 years to 2002, which is the reason why this album has tracks already used from previous albums, such tracks like "Crownin' Me" from Fly Shit, "Nobody" from Movin' On, and "Ghetto Eyes" from Da Game Owe Me album.

Track listing
 "Lil' Fly2K" – 0:09
 "Bill Chill Lives" (Featuring Bill Chill) – 5:02
 "White Boy Billy" – 0:12
 "Dude" – 0:45
 "Crownin' Me" (Featuring Bill Chill) – 5:34
 "Universal Heartthrob" (Featuring Mista Tito) – 5:48
 "Here Fly Come" – 4:30
 "Club Friendly" – 3:19
 "We Ain't Playin Witcha" – 4:17
 "M 2 da 3rd" – 0:48
 "Flexxin' Skit" (My Biggest Muscle) – 1:27
 "Life Goes On" (Featuring Maimi Maine, R-E-G, Thaistik, Bubba Willie, & D-A-V) – 5:35
 "Nobody" (Featuring Gangsta Blac & Bill Chill) – 5:44
 "Sap Sucka" – 2:14
 "Ghetto Eyes" – 4:52
 "Few & Da Proud" (Featuring Thaistik) – 4:53
 "Minnie Mae 4 Life" – 4:11
 "Here Fly Come" (Instrumental) – 6:18

Playa Fly albums
2002 albums